Khmara (Russian and Ukrainian: Хмара, Khmara) is a gender-neutral Slavic surname. Notable people with this surname include:
 (1889–1939), Ukrainian poet and literary scientist
Edward Khmara, American screenwriter
Stepan Khmara, Ukrainian politician

See also
 
Chmara (surname)

Ukrainian-language surnames